This is a list of rivers of India, starting in the west and moving along the Indian coast southward, then northward. Tributary rivers are listed hierarchically in upstream order: the lower in the list, the more upstream.

The overall discharge of rivers in India or passing/originating in India :
List of rivers of India by discharge

The major rivers of India are: 
 Flowing into the Arabian Sea: Narmada, Tapi, Sindhu, Sabarmati, Mahi, Purna
 Flowing into the Bay of Bengal: Brahmaputra, Yamuna, Ganga, Meghna, Mahanadi, Godavari, Krishna, Kaveri, Penna River

Meghna River Basin 
The Meghna-Surma-Barak River System is located in India and Bangladesh.

 Meghna River (in the Bangladesh)

 Dhaleshwari River
 Dakatia River
 Gumti River
 Feni River
 Tista River, also called the Haora River
 Surma River 
 Kangsha River
 Someshwari River
 Kushiyara River 
 Manu River
 Barak River 
 Tuivai River
 Irang River

Ganges River Basin 

 Ganga River (known as Padma in Bangladesh)

Brahmaputra
Hooghly River (distributary)
Damodar River
 Barakar River
 Jahnavi River
 Jalangi River
 River Churni
 Ichamati River
 Rupnarayan River
 Ajay River
 Mayurakshi River
 Dwarakeswar River
 Mundeswari River
 Meghna River
 Punarbhaba River
 Atrai River
 Mahananda River
 Kosi River
 kamla River
 Bagmati River
 Bhurhi Gandak River
 Phalgu
 Gandaki River (also Gandak, known as Narayani in Nepal)
 Son River
Kanhar River
Theme
Lanva, Pandu, Goita, Hathinala, Suria, Chana, Sendur, Kursa, Galphulla, Semarkhar, Riger and the Cherna Nallah
 North Koel River
 Amanat River
 Rihand River
 Gopad River
 Goini River
 Neur River
 Banas River
 Johilla River
 Ghaghara River (sometimes spelled Gogra), called Karnali River in Nepal
 West Rapti River
Rohni River
 Sarda River (also known as Chauka), called Mahakali in Nepal, also known as the Kali River along the India–Nepal border
 Ladhiya River
 Sarayu River, or Sarju River
 Gori Ganga River (or Goriganga)
 Darma River (also Dhauliganga, Darmaganga)
 Gomati River (also spelled Gomti)
 Sarayan River
 Kathna River
 Yamuna River
 Ban Ganga River
 Ken River
 Betwa River
 Dhasan River
 Halali River
 Kaliasote River
 Sindh River
 Kwari River
 Hindon River, Ghaziabad in western Uttar Pradesh
 Karban River, Agra region Uttar Pradesh
 Pahuj River in Bhind District Madhya Pradesh
 Chambal River
 Kuno River
 Banas River
 Berach River
 Bandi River
 Mashi River
 Morel River
 Kotari River
 Shipra River
 Ahar River
 Kali Sindh River
 Parbati River (Madhya Pradesh)
Gambhir River
Parbati River (Rajasthan)
 Ramganga River
 Khoh River
 Mandal River
 Alaknanda River
 Mandakini River
 Pindar River
 Nandakini River
 Dhauliganga River
Rishiganga river
 Bhagirathi River
Bhilangna River
Jalakar River

Brahmaputra River Basin 

 Beki River
 Bhogdoi River
 Dhansiri River
 Dibang River
 Dihing River
 Dikhow River
 Kameng River
 Kolong River
 Kopili River
 Lohit River
 Manas River
 Raidāk River
 Sankosh River
 Subansiri River
 Teesta River

West Bengal Coastal 
 Subarnarekha River
 Kharkai River
 Kangsabati River
Bhagirathi
Hughli
Thenad River
Mahananda River, North Bengal 
Draupadi River

Odisha Coastal 
 Baitarani
 Bhargavi
 Brahmani
 Daya
 Devi
 Hasdeo
 Ib
 Jonk
 Kathajodi
 Koina
 Kuakhai
 Kushabhadra
 Mand
 North Karo
 Ong
 Pairi
 Sankh
 Shivnath
 Sondur
 Surubalijora
 South Karo
 South Koel
 Tel River

Six major rivers of Odisha (AKA Gift Of Six Rivers):
Subarnarekha
Budhabalanga
Baitarni
Brahmani
Mahanadi
Rushikulya

Godavari River Basin 

Godavari River in Maharashtra, Chhattisgarh, Telangana, Andhra Pradesh states
Left bank tributaries:
 Purna River
 Pranahita River
 Wainganga River
Kanhan River
Kolar River
Pench River
Kulbehra River
Nag River
 Wardha River
 Penganga River
 Bandiya River 
 Sabari River
Right bank tributaries:
 Pravara River
 Manjira River
 Manair River
Other minor tributaries:
 Taliperu River
 Kinnerasani River
 Darna River
 Sindphana River

Krishna River Basin 
 Krishna River originated in Mahabaleshwar at Satara District in Maharashtra and flowing through Karnataka, Andhra Pradesh, Telangana
Main tributary rivers in Maharashtra:
Right side tributary:
 Koyna
Venna River
Warana River
Panch ganga i.e. Kumbhi, Kasari, Bhogawati, Saraswati 
 Vedganga river
 Tillari
Left side tributary:
Bhima
 Agrani
Yerala
Main tributary rivers in Karnataka:
 Varada River
 Tungabhadra River
 Tunga River
 Bhadra River
 Vedavathi River
 Suvarnamukhi River
 Veda River
 Avathi River
 Bhima River in Maharashtra and Karnataka
 Sina River
 Nira River
 Mula-Mutha River
 Mula River
 Mutha River
 Chandani River
 Kamini River
 Moshi River
 Ambi River
 Bori River
 Man River
 Bhogwati River
 Indrayani River
 Kundali River
 Kumandala River
 Ghod River
 Bhama River
 Pavna River
 Malaprabha River
 Ghataprabha River
 Varma River
 Venna River
 Urmodi River
 Koyna River in Satara district of Maharashtra state
Main tributary rivers in Telangana:
 Musi River at Hyderabad, India

Pennar River Basin 
 Pennar River

Kaveri River Basin 

 Kaveri River (Cauvery)
Kollidam (distributary)
 Amaravati River
 Arkavathy River
 
 Bhavani River
 Sarabanga River
 Noyyal River
 Hemavati River
 Kabini River
 Lakshmana Tirtha River

Tamil Nadu Coastal Rivers 
 Thamirabarani River
 Palar River
 Vaigai River
 Vaippar River
 Vellar River (Northern Tamil Nadu)
 Vellar River (Southern Tamil Nadu)
 Agniyar River
 Vasishta Nadi
 Swetha River
 Cooum River
 Adyar River
 Ponnaiyar River
 Kaveri River

Rivers flowing into the Arabian Sea

Indus Basin

 Indus River
 Panjnad River (in Pakistan)
 Sutlej River (in China, India and Pakistan)
 Spiti River
 Baspa River
 Bhaba River
 Beas River
 Parbati River
 Tirthan River
 Uhl River
 Chenab River (in India and Pakistan)
 Chandra River
 Bhaga River
 Marusudar River
 Tawi River
 Ravi River (in India and Pakistan)
 Budhil River
 Siul River
 Jhelum River (in India and Pakistan)
Lidder River
 Sind River
 Pohru River
 Kishanganga River (in India and Pakistan)
 Poonch River (in India and Pakistan)
 Suru River (in India and Pakistan)
 Dras River
 Shingo River
 Shyok River (in India and Pakistan)
 Nubra River
 Yapola River
 Zanskar River
 Markha River
 Khurna River	
 Tsarap River
 Doda River
 Hanley River

Narmada River Basin

The following rivers are part of the Narmada River's basin:

Mahi River Basin
The origin of the river Mahi is Mindha, Madhya Pradesh.
 Mahi River
 Som River
 Gomati River

Sabarmati River Basin
 Sabarmati river
 Wakal River
 Sei River
 Harnav River

Tapi River Basin
 Tapi River and its tributaries
 Tapi River (or Tapi) in Maharashtra, Madhya Pradesh and Gujarat
 Gomai River in Nandurbar district of Maharashtra
 Arunavati River in Dhule district of Maharashtra
 Panzara River in Dhule district of Maharashtra
 Kaan River in Dhule district.
 Aner River in Jalgaon, Dhule districts
 Girna River in Nashik, Malegaon, Jalgaon districts
 Titur River in Jalgaon district
 Waghur River in Jalgaon, Aurangabad districts
 Purna River in Amravati, Akola, Buldhana, Jalgaon, Navsari districts of Gujarat, Maharashtra Madhya Pradesh
 Nalganga River in Buldhana district
 Vaan River in Buldhana, Akola, Amravati districts of Maharashtra
 Morna River in Akola, Washim districts
 Katepurna River in Akola, Washim districts
 Umaa River in Akola, Washim districts
 Sangiya River in Amravati district of Maharashtra

Maharashtra Coastal Rivers
 Shastri River
 Gad River
 Vashishti River
 Savitri River
 Kundalika River
 Gandhari River
 Patalganga River
 Ulhas River
 Thane Creek (distributary)
 Vasai Creek (distributary)
 Mithi River or Mahim River
 Oshiwara River
 Dahisar River
 Tansa River in Thane
 Vaitarna River
 Surya River
 Chenna River
Terna river

Coastal rivers of Goa
 Terekhol
 Chapora
 Baga
 Mapusa
 Mandovi
Mandovi River, known as Mhadai in Western Ghats of Goa and Karnataka, has three sources: the Degao, the Nanevadichi Nhõi (nhõi means river in Konkani) and Gavali; the last two sources go dry in summer season. The main origin of the river, in the form of a spring, even during Summer season, is at Bavtyacho Dongor hills near Degao village in Khanapur Taluka of Belgaum Dist in Karnataka State.

The three streams confluence at the Kabnali village whereafter it is known as Mhadai, which has an easterly flow initially, then flows north and finally turns to the west on entering Goa. Mhadai River enters Goa between Krisnapur (Karnataka) and Kadval (Goa) villages. The tributaries of the Mhadai are the Nersa Nala, the Chapoli and Kapoli nala, the Bail Nala, the Volo Panshiro ( Karnataka), the Suko Panshiro, the Harparo, the Nanodyachi Nhõi, the Vellsachi Nhõi, the Valpoichi Nhõi, the Ghadghadyachi Nhõi, the Valvanti/ Volvot, the Divcholchi Nhõi, the Asnoddchi Nhõi, the Khandeaparchi Nhõi, the Mhapxechi Nhõi, Xinkerchi Nhõi etc. It is the longest river of Goa with a reported length of 105 km.

 Zuari
 Sal
 Talpona
 Galgibag

Karnataka Coastal Rivers
The rivers flowing through three coastal districts of Karnataka join the Arabian Sea.
 Kali River
 Netravati River
 Sharavathi River
 Aghanashini River
 Gangavalli River
 List of rivers of Dakshina Kannada and Udupi districts

Kerala Coastal Rivers

The rivers flowing through three coastal districts of Kerala to join the Arabian Sea.
 Periyar River
 Bharathapuzha River
 Pamba River
 Chaliyar River
 Chandragiri River
 Kariangode River

Rivers flowing into the inner part of India
 Ghaggar River in Haryana, Rajasthan
 Samir River
 Luni River in Rajasthan

Alphabetical list

A - D

 Arvari River
 Aarpa
 Achan Kovil River
 Adyar River
Manas river, Aganashini
 Agniyar River
 Ahar River
 Ajay River
 Aji River
 Alaknanda River
 Amanat River
 Amaravathi River
 Arkavati River
 Atrai River
 Baga River
 Baitarani River
 Balan River
 Banas River
 Banganga River
 Beas River
Bhadar River
Bhima River
Brahmani River
 Brahmaputra River
 Budha River
 Chaliya River
 Chambal River
 Chapora River
 Chenab river
 Cheyyar river
 Coovum River
 Damanganga River
 Darshan River
 Deo River
 Devi River
 Daya River
 Damodar River
 Doodhna River
 Dhansiri River
 Dudhimati River
 Dravyavati River

E - H

 Falgu River
 Gaangan
 Gadananathi River
 Galgibaga River
 Gambhir River
 Gandak
 Ganges River
 Gayathripuzha
 Ghaggar River
 Ghaghara River
 Ghataprabha
 Girija River
 Girna River
 Godavari River
 Gomti River
 Gosthani River
 Gundlakamma River
 Gunjavni River
 Halali River
.  Hasdev River Chhattisgarh
 Hugli River
 Hindon River
 Hiran River
 Hiranyakeshi River
 Gursuti River

I - L

 IB River
 Indus River
 Indravati River
 Indrayani River
 Jaldhaka
 Jhelum River
 Jayamangali River
 Jambhira River
 Kabini River
 Kadalundi River
 Kaagini River
 Kahn River (also Khan)
 Kali River- Gujarat
 Kali River- Karnataka
 Kali River- Uttarakhand
 Kali River- Uttar Pradesh
 Kali Sindh River
 Kaliasote River
 Karmanasha
 Karban River
 Kallada River
 Kallayi River
 Kalpathipuzha
 Kameng River
 Kanhan River
 Kamla River
 Kannadipuzha
 Karnaphuli River
 Kaveri River
 Kelna River
 Kathajodi River
 Kelo River
 Khadakpurna River
 Kodoor River
 Koel River
 Kolab River
 Kolar River (Madhya Pradesh)
 Kolar River (Maharashtra)
 Kollidam River
 Kosi River
 Kuakhai River
 Koyna River
 Krishna River
 Kundali River
 Kaushiga River
 Kuwanav River
 Kshipra River
 Ken River
 Karha River
 Lachen River
 Lachung River
 Lakshmana Tirtha River
 Luni River

 Kayadhu River (starts near Agarwadi in Risod Taluka in Washim district and meets Penganga near Sangam Chincholi)
 Kham River, Aurangabad Maharashtra

M - P

 Machchhu River
 Madira Puja
 Mahanadi River
 Mahananda River
 Mahakali River
 Mahi River
 Manas river.
 Mandovi River
 Manjira River
 Manu River, Tripura
 Mapusa River
 Markanda River, Haryana
 Markanda River, Tamil Nadu
 Markhandeya River, Karnataka
 Marutsudha River
 Mayurakshi River
 Meenachil River
 Meghna River
 Mithi River
 Mudangiyar River
 Mula River
 Musi River
 Mutha River
 Muvattupuzha River
 Malaprabha
 Mani River
 Manimala River
 Manorama River
 Matla River
 Moyar River
 Narava Gedda
 Narmada River
 Nethravathi River
 Nag River
 Nagavali River
 Nirguda River
 Nubra River
 Padma River
 Palar River
 Pamba River
 Pahuj River
 Pavana River
 Penganga River
 Man River
 Mandakini River (Uttarakhand)
 Pallikkal Aaru River
 Panchganga River
 Panjnad River
 Panzara River
 Parambikulam River
 Parbati River (Himachal Pradesh)
 Parbati River (Madhya Pradesh)
 Parbati River (Rajasthan)
 Payaswini
 Penna River
 Pench River
 Penganga River
 Penner River
 Periyar River
 Phalgu
 Pluest River (Poonch J&K)
 Ponnaiyar River
 Pranhita River
 Punarbhaba River
 Purna River (tributary of Godavari)
 Purna River (tributary of Tapti)

Q - T

 Ravi river
 Rapti River
 Rupnarayan River
 Sahibi River (Rajasthan)
 Saraswati River (MP)
 Sarasvati River (dried up, now under revival)
 Sarayu
 Sutlej River
 Suvarnamukhi River
 Sabarmati River
 Sal River
 Shalmali River near Sode
 Shivnath River Chhattisgarh
 Sirsi, Karnataka
 Sharavati River
 Sengar River
 Shetrunji River
 Son River
 Sharda River
 Shimsha River (Karnataka)
 Shyok River
 Subarnarekha River
 Talpona River
 Tapi River
 Thamirabarani River
 Tangri River
 Thate Puthra River
 Tungabhadra River
 Tamsa River
 Tunga river
 Terekhol River

U - W

 Vaan River
 Vaigai River
 Vamsadhara River
 Varuna River
 Vashishti River
 Vedavathi River
 Vellar River (Northern Tamil Nadu)
 Vellar River (Southern Tamil Nadu)
 Vrishabhavathi River
 Vishwamitri River
 Vaitarna
 Udyavara River
 Ulhas River
 Uttara Cauvery River
 Wainganga River
 Wagh River
 Wardha River
 Wehashli River

X - Z

 Yagachi River (Karnataka)
 Yamuna River
 Zuari River

See also

 Indian rivers interlinking project
 Irrigation in India
 List of dams and reservoirs in India
 List of rivers in India by discharge
 List of National Waterways in India
 Major rivers of India
 RORO ferries in India
 Sagar Mala project

References

Further reading
Bhalerao, S.M., Encyclopedia of Indian Rivers (in English)
Vol. 1: Scientific Information, pages 1–836
Vol. 2: Scientific Information, pages 837-1760
Vol. 3: Scientific, Cultural, Historical Information, pages 1760-2308
Vol. 4: Book of 60 Maps
Year of publication: 2019, Diamond Publications, Pune 411030, India (www.diamondbookspune.com)
Bhalerao, S.M., Bharatiya Sarita Kosh (in Marathi), (Encyclopedia of Indian Rivers)
Vol. 1: Scientific Information, pages 1–788
Vol. 2: Scientific Information, pages 789-1660
Vol. 3: Scientific, Cultural, Historical Information, pages 1661-2468
Vol. 4: Book of 60 Maps
Year of publication 2007, Diamond Publications, Pune 411030, India (www.diamondbookspune.com)

External links
 

yamuna mission